Miloslav Holub should not be confused with the Czech poet Miroslav Holub.

Miloslav Holub (27 February 191512 March 1999) was a Czech actor, perhaps best known for his appearances (ranging from leads to cameo roles) in five films by Karel Zeman. He was also occasionally billed as Miroslav Holub.

Selected filmography
 The Trap (1950)
 The Tank Brigade (1955)
 The Fabulous World of Jules Verne (1958)
 The Slinger (1960)
 The Fabulous Baron Munchausen (1961)
 A Jester's Tale (1964) (as Miroslav Holub)
 The Stolen Airship (1967)
 On the Comet (1970)
 The Ear (1970)
 The Key (1971)

References

External links
 
 Miloslav Holub at kinobox.cz

1915 births
Place of birth missing
1999 deaths
Place of death missing
Czech male film actors
Czech male television actors
20th-century Czech male actors